Mon Mome is an AQPS racehorse, which won the 2009 John Smith's Grand National at Aintree Racecourse, run on April 4, 2009. It was ridden by Liam Treadwell and trained by Venetia Williams. He won by 12-lengths at odds of 100–1, making Mon Mome the largest-priced winner since Foinavon in 1967.

Mon Mome was victorious in the second of three attempts to win the Grand National, having finished tenth in 2008 and parting company with rider Aidan Coleman in the 2010 race at the twenty-sixth of the thirty fences.

His victory in the 2009 race was exactly a century since the previous victory by a French bred horse in the Grand National.

He was also third in the 2010 Cheltenham Gold Cup.

He was retired at the age of 13, with his last appearance being at Warwick on 10 March 2013. Trainer Williams said: "He's been an amazing horse to train and gave me the best day of my career when winning the Grand National."

References

2000 racehorse births
Grand National winners
Racehorses bred in France
Non-Thoroughbred racehorses